Events in the year 1349 in Norway.

Incumbents
Monarch: Haakon VI Magnusson

Events

The devastating pandemic named Black Death  reached Norway. It is estimated that roughly 60% of the population in Norway died from the pest.

Arts and literature

Births

Deaths
after 17 October – Arne Einarsson Vade, Archbishop of Nidaros (born c. 1300).

60% of Norwegians

References

Norway